CPA Australia ("Certified Practising Accountant") is a professional accounting body in Australia founded in 1886. As of 31 December 2020, it has 168,736 members  working in 150 countries and regions around the world. CPA Australia currently has 19 staffed offices across Australia, China, Hong Kong, Malaysia, Singapore, Indonesia, Vietnam, New Zealand and the UK.

History
The current form of CPA Australia dates from 1952, when the Commonwealth Institute and Federal Institute merged to create the Australian Society of Accountants. In July 1990 the name changed to the Australian Society of Certified Practising Accountants, and in April 2000, the name became CPA Australia.

The main predecessor bodies of the Society, with year of formation, were:
Incorporated Institute of Accountants, 1886 
Federal Institute of Accountants, 1894
Association of Accountants of Australia, 1910
Australasian Institute of Cost Accountants, 1920

CEO controversy
The CEO of CPA Australia from 2008, Alex Malley, came under significant criticism in the media and from CPA members in 2017 for his A$1.8 million annual salary and for the significant amounts of CPA funds going towards promoting Malley and his personal interests, such as a paid television show and Malley's autobiography. The scandal surrounding Malley, combined with broader member discontent over executive changes that made the board unaccountable and debts accrued from the establishment of a financial planning arm, led to the resignation of the CPA president Tyrone Carlin in May 2017, and then to two board members resigning a week later in June 2017. The resigning board members, Richard Alston and Kerry Ryan, cited the presence of "board allies of chief executive Alex Malley" refusing to "allow a wide-ranging review of Mr Malley and the organisation" as their main reason. The board resignations had also followed former Future Fund Chairman and Commonwealth Bank CEO, David Murray, who resigned his 40-year CPA membership in response to what he saw as poor management within CPA.

On 15 June, a further three directors resigned due to the expanding scandal surrounding Malley and the remaining board initiated an "independent review" of all claims made against CPA and its CEO, to be chaired by former chief of the Australian Defence Force, Sir Angus Houston. However, even the decision to create the review came under criticism when it was revealed that Houston had appeared as guest on Malley's TV program and had written a glowing foreword in Malley's book. Houston later resigned his post in favour of former Commonwealth Auditor-General, Ian McPhee.

Facing a significant swelling of discontent amongst CPA members, in June 2017 it was announced that the CPA board had terminated the contract of Malley, resulting in CPA paying out the remainder of his contract to the sum of A$4.9 million. On the developing scandal, Sydney Morning Herald journalist Colin Kruger noted: "Accountancy is meant to be the profession of sober financial clarity. [...] Not the sort of profession for flashy types, accountants are meant to be the score keepers, not the goal scorers. It makes the lack of accountability, and financial clarity, from the top accounting body in Australia – CPA Australia – all the more incongruous."

In August 2017, it was announced that the remaining board members would resign their positions at the end of the year, to make way for an entirely new board. The subsequent review report released in September 2017 found that the "chief executive was overpaid, [CPA Australia] had lost touch with its members and provided questionable value for money for the services it rendered." In addition to CPA's "over-emphasis on marketing and brand building activities that centred on the former CEO", the review in particular noted the excessive CEO's salary, with its many increases over several years not being justified by organisational growth.

Membership
Full members of CPA Australia use the designatory letters CPA, while senior members may become Fellows and use the letters FCPA.

Arms

See also
 Chartered Accountants Australia and New Zealand
 International Qualification Examination
 International Federation of Accountants

References

External links
CPA Australia's website

Accounting in Australia
Member bodies of the International Federation of Accountants